Maple Leaf Square is a multi-use complex and public square located in the South Core neighbourhood of Toronto, Ontario, Canada. It is located to the west of the Scotiabank Arena on the former Railway Lands. The $500 million development was jointly developed by Cadillac Fairview, Lanterra and Maple Leaf Sports & Entertainment (MLSE), who own the nearby Scotiabank Arena. The complex has  of usable space covering  on one city block.

Name
Maple Leaf Square is named after Maple Leaf Sports & Entertainment, which owns the Toronto Maple Leafs and Toronto Raptors, both of which play in Scotiabank Arena next to the square. During the 2014 postseason for the Raptors, the public square became a popular gathering area to view playoff games, and was nicknamed by fans as Jurassic Park, in reference to the film from which the Raptors team name originated. The square is now colloquially referred to as Jurassic Park by the fans and media in addition to the real name, the Raptors Tailgate.

On September 25, 2014, it was reported that the official name of the square would be changed to Ford Square from Maple Leaf Square, after the Ford Motor Company of Canada's purchase of naming rights to the square. After public uproar to the rename, five days later, MLSE said that those reports were "premature and unfounded" and that they would not get rid of the name.  Instead, they announced that the square would be rebranded as the Ford Fan Zone at Maple Leaf Square due to a five-year sponsorship deal with Ford Canada.

History
Construction on the project began in January 2007.

The two glass and cast-in-place concrete towers are 65 storeys, containing 872 residential units, a 167-room Hotel LeGermain Boutique Hotel,  of office space,  of retail space, a  daycare centre, a high-definition theatre that broadcasts Leafs Nation Network and NBA TV Canada 24-hours a day, and four levels of underground parking with nearly 900 spaces.

The retail complex includes a Longo's grocery, a  sports bar called Real Sports Bar and Grill, a sports retail store called Real Sports Apparel, a fine dining restaurant called E11even, a fan apparel specific location of Sportchek and a branch of the Toronto Dominion Bank. For residents, there is a rooftop garden and swimming pool. The development was designed to achieve LEED (Leadership in Energy and Environmental Design) Silver status for the project's environmental sustainability.

The building partly served as inspiration for LECOM Harborcenter, a multi-use building built near KeyBank Center in Buffalo, New York by Buffalo Sabres and Buffalo Bills owner Terrence Pegula's Pegula Sports and Entertainment. The similarity is most noticeable in the design of the restaurant: LECOM Harborcenter's 716 Food and Sport was largely based on Maple Leaf Square's Real Sports Bar and Grill.

Public square

The public square has a capacity of 5,000 people. It hosts pre-game gatherings and other sports-related events.

In conjunction with the project, the Scotiabank Arena itself on the side of Maple Leaf Square was renovated. The renovations included a  atrium addition to the west side of the arena which abuts the plaza. The outside wall of the atrium features a 50 by  video screen overlooking the plaza which was inspired by similar plazas at L.A. Live in Los Angeles, and Victory Park in Dallas. Games going on inside the arena are often displayed live on the outdoor screen.

The square was the first such plaza in Canada. It has been since emulated in Edmonton with a plaza in the Ice District by Daryl Katz, owner of the Edmonton Oilers and in Winnipeg with True North Square by True North Sports and Entertainment, owners of the Winnipeg Jets.

Viewing space for sports
The public square holds special outdoor viewings of significant games like home openers and playoff games for both the Toronto Maple Leafs and Toronto Raptors on a giant video screen affixed above the west entrance of Scotiabank Arena. Maple Leaf Sports & Entertainment, which owns both franchises, puts concession and merchandise stands on the square during such occasions. These viewings happen regardless of whether the team is playing at home or on the road. Popularity of this fan experience has risen over the years and has required heightened security and traffic control. Interest in attendance reached a new level on May 25, 2019 to watch the Raptors win Game 6 of the Eastern Conference Finals to advance to the NBA Finals for the first time. Following the Raptors' historic win in the 2019 NBA Finals, the City of Toronto renamed as Raptors Way a portion of Bremner Boulevard from York Street to Lake Shore Boulevard.

See also
South Core, Toronto
List of tallest buildings in Canada
List of tallest buildings in Toronto

References

External links
 
 Maple Leaf Square Condos
 Photos of the project
 Photos of the Building

Squares in Toronto
PATH (Toronto)
Buildings and structures in Toronto
Skyscrapers in Toronto
Entertainment districts in Canada
Leadership in Energy and Environmental Design basic silver certified buildings
Leadership in Energy and Environmental Design certified buildings in Canada
Commercial buildings completed in 2010
Railway Lands
Maple Leaf Sports & Entertainment
Cadillac Fairview
Skyscraper office buildings in Canada
Retail buildings in Canada
Residential skyscrapers in Canada
Skyscraper hotels in Canada
Toronto Maple Leafs
Toronto Raptors